Brother, Can You Spare a Dime? is a 1975 documentary film directed by Philippe Mora, consisting largely of newsreel footage and contemporary film clips to portray the era of the Great Depression.

Summary
The film serves as a nostalgic and evocative scrapbook of the Depression from the Wall Street Crash of 1929 to the Attack on Pearl Harbor.

Cast

 The Andrews Sisters
 Fred Astaire
 Warner Baxter
 Jack Benny
 Busby Berkeley
 Willie Best
 Humphrey Bogart
 George Burns
 James Cagney
 Cab Calloway
 Eddie Cantor
 Hobart Cavanaugh
 George Chandler
 Charlie Chaplin
 Winston Churchill
 Betty Compson
 Gary Cooper
 Bing Crosby
 Frankie Darro
 Cecil B. DeMille
 Marlene Dietrich
 John Dillinger
 Walt Disney
 James Dunn
 Cliff Edwards
 Dwight D. Eisenhower
 Bill Elliot
 Madge Evans
 Stepin Fetchit
 W. C. Fields
 Dick Foran
 Gerald Ford
 Clark Gable
 Benny Goodman
 Cary Grant
 Woody Guthrie
 Gabby Hayes
 Billie Holiday
 Herbert Hoover
 J. Edgar Hoover
 Paul Robeson
 Shirley Temple

Selected films featured
King Kong
I Am a Fugitive from a Chain Gang
Citizen Kane
Wild Boys of the Road 
The Roaring Twenties
American Madness
Mr. Smith Goes to Washington
Gold Diggers of 1933
Lady Killer
G Men

Accolades
1976: Nominated-Golden Globe Award for Best Documentary Film

Availability
A DVD from Image Entertainment was released in 1999 and again in 2018 by Artiflix.

It is available on DVD and Blu-Ray via The Sprocket Vault.

See also
All This and World War II, a similar 1976 'scrapbook' documentary about World War II scored to music of the Beatles.

References

External links
 
 
 Promo on Sprocket Vault's official YouTube channel

1975 films
British documentary films
Documentary films about United States history
Great Depression films
1975 documentary films
Films directed by Philippe Mora
Compilation films
Collage film
Dimension Pictures films
American documentary films
1970s English-language films
1970s American films
1970s British films